Leif Knudtzon (23 December 1895 – 16 July 1925) was a Norwegian modern pentathlete. He competed at the 1924 Summer Olympics. Knudtzon died in a plane crash in Kristiansand in 1925.

References

External links
 

1895 births
1925 deaths
Norwegian male modern pentathletes
Olympic modern pentathletes of Norway
Modern pentathletes at the 1924 Summer Olympics
Sportspeople from Oslo